Principality of Pir or Pir principality (1086-1099/1100) — was a small independent Armenian principality at the Euphrates river in the Near East

History 
In second half XI c. After invasion of Turkic tribes in Armenia and following Byzantine annexation of Armenian lands, were increased Armenian migration out of Transcaucasus to the Northern part  of  the Near East. Were formed a lot of independent Armenian principalities as result of this process. One of them was the princedom of Pir which was founded by Abelkharib Pahlavuni in 1086. But this state existed not a long. When  crusaders appeared in the region, they formed their first state in the East which was called the County of Edessa. After that the crusaders occupied the Pir principality and expelled his founder.

References 

Pir